Paul T. Herman (July 5, 1921 – July 20, 1972) was an American professional basketball player. He played in the National Basketball League for the Youngstown Bears and Flint Dow A.C.'s and averaged 5.8 points per game.

References

1921 births
1972 deaths
United States Army personnel of World War II
American men's basketball players
Basketball players from Ohio
Flint Dow A.C.'s players
Guards (basketball)
Military personnel from Ohio
Sportspeople from Massillon, Ohio
Tennessee Volunteers basketball players
Youngstown Bears players